The House of Estridsen was a dynasty that provided the kings of Denmark from 1047 to 1412.  The dynasty is named after its ancestor Estrid Svendsdatter.  The dynasty is sometimes called the Ulfinger, after Estrid's husband, Ulf Jarl. The dynasty also provided three of the rulers of Sweden in the years 1125–1412. Their family coat of arms became the coat of arms of Denmark and therefore influenced the coat of arms of Tallinn and the coat of arms of Estonia.

The Royal Court of Denmark does not differentiate between different royal houses among the early Danish kings, but uses the term "the descent of Gorm the Old" about all the pre-Oldenburg monarchs.

Background 
The name of the Estridsen dynasty recalls their acquisition of the Danish crown through the marriage of Ulf the Earl to Estrid Svendsdatter of the House of Knýtlinga, daughter of Sweyn Forkbeard and sister of Cnut the Great. Later genealogies (introduced by the Danish historian Jakob Langebek in the 18th century) trace the family from Jomsviking leader Styrbjörn the Strong, a scion of the Swedish royal family, who in turn is given a descent from legendary King Sigurd Hring, regarded as mythical by most modern historians (no actual sources mention such an ancestry). Reliable ancestry traces back no earlier than Ulf's own father, the obscure Thorgil Sprakling and grandfather Björn (in sources called Ursius), the latter thus alternatively being identified as the above Styrbjörn by Langebek.

The dynasty reached its peak with the Kalmar Union, when its members reigned as kings of Denmark, Norway and Sweden in personal union. The dynasty came to end in 1412 with the death of its last member Queen Margaret I. All of the subsequent monarchs of Denmark are cognatic descendants of the House of Estridsen.

Line of descent

From Thorgil Sprakling to Eric I the Good 
 Thorgil Sprakling
 Ulf the Earl, murdered in 1026, probably Jarl in England from 1017, married Estrid Svendsdatter (990/997 — 1057/1073), a daughter of Sweyn Forkbeard ( – 1014) and a sister of Cnut the Great ( – 1035)
 Sweyn II of Denmark ( – 1076), Jarl from 1042, King of Denmark from 1047
 Sweyn the Crusader, murdered in 1097, married Florine (d. 1097), the daughter of Odo I, Duke of Burgundy
 Harald III ( – 1080)
 Sigrid, married Gottschalk (d. 1066), a prince of the Obotrites
 Saint Canute IV ( – 1086), Jarl of Zealand from 1076, King of Denmark from 1080, married Adela ( – 1115), daughter of Robert I, Count of Flanders 
 Blessed Charles the Good (1083-1127), murdered on 2 March 1127 in Bruges, Count of Flanders from 1119, married  to Margaret, daughter of Renaud II, Count of Clermont-en-Beauvaisis
 Cecilia ( – 1131), married to Erik Jarl in Västergötland
 Ingerid ( – ?), married Folke the Fat Jarl in Sweden
 Olaf I ( – 1095), Jarl of Southern Jutland from 1080, King of Denmark from 1086, married Ingegerd, the daughter of King Harald Hardrada of Norway
 Ingerid, married  to King Olaf III of Norway
 Eric I the Good (Slangerup, Denmark – 10 July 1103, Paphos, Cyprus), Jarl of Zealand from 1080, King of Denmark from 1095 — for his descendants, see below
 Svend Tronkræver (d. 1104)
 Henrik Skadelår ( – 4 June 1134)
 Magnus II of Sweden (d. 1161), King of Sweden from 1160, married Brigida, daughter of King Harald IV Gille of Norway
 Canute (d. 12 March 1162), Duke of Southern Jutland from 1150, Duke of Jutland from 1157
 Buris (1130-1167), Duke of Southern Jutland from 1162, married  to a daughter of Herman II, Count of Winzenburg
 Niels, killed 25 June 1134, King of Denmark from 1104, married Margaret Fredkulla, a daughter of King Inge the Elder of Sweden
 Magnus I ( – 4 June 1134), Duke of Västergötland from 1125, King of Denmark from 1134, married Richeze, a daughter of Bolesław III Wrymouth
 Canute V ( – 9 August 1157), Duke of Jutland from 1147, co-ruler of Denmark from 1154, married in 1156 to Helena, a daughter of King Sverker I of Sweden
 Saint Niels (d. 1180)
 Valdemar (d. 18 July 1236 in Cîteaux Abbey), Bishop of Schleswig from 1182 to 1208, Archbishop of Bremen in 1192
 Björn (killed in 1049), Earl in England
 Asbjörn (d. probably 1086), Jarl in Denmark
 Gytha, married Godwin of Wessex; one of their children was King Harold II of England
 Eilaf (first mentioned 1009), Earl in England

From Eric the Good to Christopher I 
 Eric I the Good (Slangerup, Denmark – 10 July 1103, Paphos, Cyprus), Jarl of Zealand from 1080, King of Denmark from 1095 — for his ancestors, see above
 Saint Canute Lavard (March 12, 1096 – 7 January 1131), King of Southern Jutland from 1115, King of the Wends from 1129, married Ingeborg, a daughter of Mstislav I of Kiev
 Christina (–1139), married King Magnus IV of Norway
 Valdemar the Great (14 January 1131 – 12 May 1182), King of Denmark, married in 1157 to Sophia of Minsk (d. 5 May 1198), daughter of Volodar of Minsk
 (illegitimate) Christopher (d. 1173), Duke of Southern Jutland
 Sophie (d. 1208), married Siegfried III, Count of Orlamünde (d. 1206)
 Canute VI (1163 – 12 November 1202), King of Denmark from 1182, married in 1177 to Gertrude, daughter of Henry the Lion
 Valdemar II (1170 – 28 March 1241), King of Denmark from 1202, married (1) in 1205 to Dagmar, daughter of King Ottokar I of Bohemia, and (2) in 1214 to Berengeria, daughter of King Sancho I of Portugal
 (illegitimate) Niels, Count of Halland from 1216 — descendants: the counts of Halland, died out in 1314
 (illegitimate) Canute (1211 – 15 October 1260), Duke of Estonia from 1219, Duke of Blekinge from 1232, Duke of Lolland from before 1260, married Hedwig, a daughter of Swietopelk I, Duke of Pomerania — descendants: the Lords of Skarsholm, died out before 1408
 (1m) Valdemar ( – 28 November 1231), co-ruler of Denmark from 1215, married Eleanor, a daughter of King Afonso II of Portugal
 (2m) Eric IV ( – 9 August 1250), King of Denmark from 1241, married in 1239 to Jutta, a daughter of Albert I, Duke of Saxony
 Sophia (1241–1286), married Valdemar, King of Sweden
 Ingeborg (d. 1287), married King Magnus VI of Norway
 Jutta (1246–1286/95), mistress of Valdemar, King of Sweden, later Abbess of St. Agneta
 Agnes (1249–after 1290), founding Abbess of St. Agneta
 Sophie (1217 – 2 November 1247), married in 1230 to John I, Margrave of Brandenburg (d. 3 April 1266) 
 Abel (1218 – 29 June 1252), King of Denmark from 1250, married Matilda of Holstein (d. 1288) — for his descendants, see below
 Christopher I (1219 – 29 May 1259), King of Denmark from 1252, married in 1248 to Margaret Sambiria, daughter of Duke Sambor II of Pomerelia — for his descendants, see below
 Ingeborg (1175 – 29 July 1236), married in 1193, to King Philip II of France (d. 14 July 1223)
 Helena ( – 22 November 1233), married in 1202 to Duke William of Lüneburg (d. 1213) 
 Richeza (1190–1220), married King Eric X of Sweden (d. 1216)
 Harald Kesja (1080–1135), from 1102 to 1103 regent of Denmark, married Ragnhild Magnusdotter, a daughter of King Magnus III of Norway
 Björn Ironside (d.1134), married Catherine Ingesdotter, the daughter of King Inge I of Sweden
 Christina (d. 1170), married King Eric IX of Sweden (d. 18 May 1160), King of Sweden from 1156
 Olaf (d. ), Danish anti-king
 (illegitimate) Harald Skrænk, leader of a peasant rebellion in Scania, 
 Ragnhild Eriksdatter, married Hakon Sunnivasson
 Eric III ( – 27 August 1146), King of Denmark from 1137, married in 1155 to Lutgard, the daughter of Count Rudolf I of Stade
 (illegitimate) Magnus Eriksen, imprisoned 1178
  Eric II ( – 18 July 1137), King of Denmark from 1134, married Malmfred, a daughter of Grand Prince Mstislav I of Kiev
 Sweyn III ( – 23 October 1157), King of Zealand from 1147, King of Denmark from 1152, married Adela, a daughter of Conrad, Margrave of Meissen 
 Luitgard, married Margrave Berthold I of Istria (d. 1188), Count of Andechs, from 1173 Margrave of Istria

Dukes of Schleswig (Abelslægten) 
 Abel (1218 – 29 June 1252), King of Denmark from 1250, married Matilda of Holstein (d. 1288) — for his ancestors, see above
 Valdemar III (d. 1257), Duke of Duchy of Schleswig, (or, as the Danes call it, Southern Jutland) from 1253
 Sophie (born 1240, d. aft. 1284), married Bernhard I, Prince of Anhalt-Bernburg (ca. 1218–1287); Christian I of Denmark was their great-great-great-great-grandson, the current Queen Margaret II descends from Christian I
 Eric I (d. 27 May 1272), Duke of Schleswig from 1260, married Margaret, a daughter of Jaromar II, Prince of Rugia
 Valdemar IV (d. 1312), Duke of Schleswig from 1283, married Elisabeth, a daughter of John I, Duke of Saxony 
 Eric II ( – 12 March 1325), Duke of Schleswig from 1312, married Adelaide, a daughter of Henry I, Count of Holstein-Rendsburg
 Valdemar V (1314–1364), Duke of Schleswig from 1325 to 1326 and from 1330 to 1364, King of Denmark as Valdemar III from 1326 to 1330, married Richardis, a daughter of Gunzelin VI, Count of Schwerin
 Valdemar ( – 1360)
 Henry ( – August 1375), Duke of Schleswig from 1364
 Helvig (d. 1374), married King Valdemar IV of Denmark (d. 24 October 1375) (see below)
 (illegitimate) Valdemar Eriksen Sappi (d. 1398)
 (illegitimate) Abel Valdemarsen — descendants: the Rynd family (died out in 1405)
 Margaret (d. after 1313), married Helmold III, Count of Schwerin
 Eric Longbone (1272–1310), Lord of Langeland, married Sophie, a daughter of Burchard VII, Burgrave of Magdeburg
 Abel (1252 – 2 April 1279), Lord of Langeland, married Matilda, a daughter of Gunzelin III, Count of Schwerin

From Christopher I to Margaret I 
 Christopher I (1219 – 29 May 1259), King of Denmark from 1252, married in 1248 to Margaret Sambiria, daughter of Duke Sambor II of Pomerelia — for his ancestors, see above
 Eric V "Klipping" (1249 – November 22, 1286), King of Denmark from 1259, married Agnes, a daughter of John I, Margrave of Brandenburg 
 Eric VI Menved (1274 – 13 November 1319), King of Denmark from 1286, married Ingeborg Magnusdotter (1277-1319), a daughter of King Magnus III of Sweden 
 Christopher II (29 September 1276 – 2 August 1332), King of Denmark from 1320 to 1326 and from 1329 to 1332, married Euphemia, a daughter of Bogislaw IV, Duke of Pomerania 
 Margaret, (1305–1340), married Louis V, Duke of Bavaria (d. 18 September 1361) 
 Eric (1305 – 1331 or 1332), Elected King of Denmark in 1321, married Elisabeth, a daughter of Henry I, Count of Holstein-Rendsburg
 Otto ( – after 1341), Duke of Lolland and Estonia
 Valdemar IV "Atterdag" ( – 24 October 1375), King of Denmark from 1340, married Helvig, a daughter of Eric II, Duke of Schleswig (see above)
 Christopher (d. 11 June 1363), Duke of Lolland from 1359
 Ingeborg (1 April 1347 – before 16 June 1370), married Henry III, Duke of Mecklenburg (d. 24 April 1383), the grandparents of Eric of Pomerania, King of Norway as Eric III, King of Denmark as Eric VII, and King of Sweden as Eric XIII
 Margaret I (March 1353 – 28 October 1412), Queen regnant of Denmark from 1375 to 1385 and from 1387 to 1396, Queen regnant of Norway from 1380 to 1385 and from 1387 to 1398, Queen regnant of Sweden from 1389 to 1396, co-founder of the Union of Kalmar in 1397, married in 1363 to Haakon Magnusson (d. 1380), King of Norway from 1355 as Haakon VI, King of Sweden from 1362 to 1364 as Håkan (they had one son who belonged to the Swedish dynasty)
 (illegitimate) Erik Christoffersen Løvenbalk, his male line descendants, the Løvenbalk family, died out after June 1598; Frederick VIII, Duke of Schleswig-Holstein descends from him in the female line and his granddaughter married back into the Danish royal family
 Richeza (d. before 27 October 1318), married Lord Nicholas II of Werle (d. 1316); Christian I of Denmark was their great-great-great grandson, the current Queen Margaret II descends from Christian I
 Martha (d. 2 March 13041), married in 1298 to Birger Magnusson (d. 31 May 1321), King of Sweden from 1290
 Matilda, married Albert III, Margrave of Brandenburg-Salzwedel (d. 1300) 
 Margaret ( – 1306), married to John II, Count of Holstein-Kiel (d. 1321)

See also 
:Template:House of Estridsen
House of Olaf
House of Knýtlinga
House of Oldenburg

References 

 Detlev Schwennicke: Europäische Stammtafeln, vol II, 1984, table 98 ff

External links

 
Danish noble families
Swedish noble families
Norwegian noble families
Family trees
Medieval Denmark
Medieval Sweden
Estridsen